The Indiana State Auditor is a constitutional and elected office in the executive branch of the government of the U.S. State of Indiana. The Auditor of Indiana is elected to a four-year term and is subject to term limits where the officeholder is bound to serving eight years out of any twelve-year period. In this position, the auditor serves as the state's chief financial officer and is in charge of the oversight of state funds and revenue. The incumbent state auditor is Tera Klutz. Klutz has held this position since being appointed by Indiana Governor Eric Holcomb. Klutz was appointed to the position after her predecessor, Suzanne Crouch resigned to become Lieutenant Governor of Indiana. In 2008, the annual salary of the auditor of Indiana was $66,000.

List of auditors

|Republican

Territorial Auditors

State Auditors

Notes

See also

Government of Indiana

Sources

External links

State auditors and comptrollers of the United States
1816 establishments in Indiana